Tyn-y-Coed Farmhouse is a grade II Listed Building in Caerdeon, Barmouth, Gwynedd.
This Georgian farm house was built in 1756 and later extended and altered in 1884. A rubble built farmhouse with slate roof was listed approximately 1995.

References

Barmouth
Grade II listed buildings in Gwynedd
Houses in Gwynedd
Grade II listed houses
Farmhouses in Wales